Daniel Fulanse (born 5 February 1962) is a Zambian boxer. He competed in the men's light welterweight event at the 1992 Summer Olympics.

References

External links
 

1962 births
Living people
Zambian male boxers
Olympic boxers of Zambia
Boxers at the 1992 Summer Olympics
Place of birth missing (living people)
Light-welterweight boxers